Leptacanthichthys gracilispinis, the Plainchin dreamarm, is a species of dreamer found in the northern oceans at depths of around  occasionally as deep as .  Females of this species grow to a length of  SL while the parasitic males grow only to as long as  SL.  This species is the only known member of its genus.

References
 

Oneirodidae
Taxa named by Charles Tate Regan
Fish described in 1925